The 2013–14 Grambling State Tigers men's basketball team represented Grambling State University during the 2013–14 NCAA Division I men's basketball season. The Tigers, led by second year head coach Joseph Price, played their home games at the Fredrick C. Hobdy Assembly Center and were members of the Southwestern Athletic Conference. They finished the season 5–24, 3–15 in SWAC play to finish in last place. They were ineligible for postseason play due to APR penalties. However, the SWAC received a waiver to allow its teams under APR penalties to still participate in the SWAC tournament where Grambling State advanced to the quarterfinals where they lost to Texas Southern.

Roster

Schedule

|-
!colspan=9 style="background:#000000; color:#D9D919;"| Regular season

|-
!colspan=9 style="background:#000000; color:#D9D919;"| 2014 SWAC tournament

References

Grambling State Tigers men's basketball seasons
Grambling State
Gramb
Gramb